The 2012–13 season was Inverness Caledonian Thistle's third consecutive season in the Scottish Premier League, having been promoted from the Scottish First Division at the end of the 2009–10 season. Inverness also competed in the League Cup and the Scottish Cup.

Results and fixtures

Pre-season

Scottish Premier League

Scottish League Cup

Scottish Cup

Player statistics

Captains

Appearances & Goals
Includes all competitive matches. 
Last updated 19 May 2013

|}

Hat-tricks

Disciplinary record
Includes all competitive matches. 
Last updated 19 May 2013

Team statistics

League table

Position summary

Most frequent line-up
By number of appearances
As of 19 May 2013

'''Formation: 4–2–3–1.

Personnel Awards
Last updated 19 April 2013

Transfers

Players in

Players out

References 

2012andndash;13
Inverness Caledonian Thistle